Edgar Johnson Goodspeed (October 23, 1871 – January 13, 1962) was an American theologian and scholar of Greek and the New Testament, and Ernest DeWitt Burton Distinguished Service Professor of the University of Chicago until his retirement. He taught for many years at the University of Chicago, whose collection of New Testament manuscripts he enriched by his searches. The University's collection is now named in his honor.

Biography 
Edgar J. Goodspeed was born in Quincy, Illinois. He was the son of Thomas Wakefield Goodspeed. At the age of ten, Goodspeed has been tutored in Latin by his father's students at Baptist Union Theological Seminary in Morgan Park, Illinois. Edgar J. Goodspeed received pre-college classes at the Old University of Chicago, and finished in 1886.

His wife's name was Elfleda Bond, and his father-in-law was Joseph Bond.

He died in 1962 and was interred in the Forest Lawn Memorial Park Cemetery in Glendale, California.

Education 
He earned a B.A. from Denison University in Granville, Ohio 1890, and he then studied Semitics at Yale for one year under William Rainey Harper. A little later, Harper was appointed as the first president of the University of Chicago, and Goodspeed moved to Chicago and continued his graduate studies at this new institution, where Goodspeed's father was one of the founders and secretary of the Board of Trustees. He was a post-graduate fellow at the University of Chicago from 1892,  and he received his Doctor of Biblical Studies degree in 1897.

Goodspeed received his Ph.D. in 1898 at The University of Chicago. He spent the following two years abroad, traveling and studying in Germany, England, the Netherlands, Egypt, Palestine, and Greece.

Later, in 1928, Goodspeed later he also received a doctorate in Divinity from the Denison University (Doctor honoris causa).

Academic work 

While pursuing graduate work, Goodspeed taught classics at two Chicago-area schools, the Morgan Park Academy and South Side Academy. He taught In classical languages at the Morgan Park Academy in 1891 and 1892 and at the South Side Academy from 1894 to 1898. He taught Biblical and Patristic Greek at the University of Chicago starting in 1898.

Upon his return to Chicago in 1900, he again joined the University faculty and rose steadily to become Professor of Biblical and Patristic Greek in 1915. In 1919 he served as president of the Society of Biblical Literature and Exegesis. When his New Testament colleague Ernest DeWitt Burton was appointed president of the University of Chicago in 1923, Goodspeed succeeded him as Chairman of the Department of New Testament and Early Christian Literature. From 1929 to 1937 Goodspeed was chairman of the department of New Testament studies at the University of Chicago. In 1937, Goodspeed became an emeritus member of the faculty and retired with his wife, Elfleda Bond Goodspeed, to a home in Bel-Air, California.

Awards 
Doctor honoris causa (D.D.), Denison University, 1928

Works 
According to the University of Chicago Library during the Goodspeed lifetime "he wrote 64 books, collaborated on 16 others, and published 189 major articles and countless reviews".

Bible translations 

He is widely remembered for his translations of the Bible: The New Testament: an American Translation (1923), and (with John Merlin Powis Smith) "The Bible, An American Translation" (1935), the "Goodspeed Bible". He is also remembered for his translation of the Apocrypha, and that translation was included in The Complete Bible, An American Translation (1939). Finally, Harper & Brothers issued his widely heralded The Apostolic Fathers: An American Translation (1950).

Aside from his scholarly work, he wrote many non-dogmatic introductions to biblical literature for the lay reader:

Books

Edited by

References

Sources

External links
Goodspeed, "The translators to the Reader": Goodspeed's thesis on the Preface to the King James Version, 1611
Goodspeed and the Goodspeed Collection of Manuscripts at Chicago

 
 
 

1871 births
1962 deaths
People from Quincy, Illinois
American theologians
New Testament scholars
Denison University alumni
Translators of the Bible into English
Burials at Forest Lawn Memorial Park (Glendale)